Makalaus or Makalausfjellet is a mountain on the border of Nord-Aurdal Municipality and Sør-Aurdal Municipality in Innlandet county, Norway.

See also
List of mountains of Norway

References

Mountains of Innlandet
Nord-Aurdal
Sør-Aurdal